Sefid Bala (also Romanized as Sefīd Bālā; also known as Sefīd Bālā-ye Pā’īn) is a village in Pain Velayat Rural District, in the Central District of Taybad County, Razavi Khorasan Province, Iran. At the 2006 census, its population was 14, in 4 families.

References 

Populated places in Taybad County